The men's ski cross event in freestyle skiing at the 2010 Winter Olympics in Vancouver, British Columbia, Canada, took place on 21 February at the Cypress Bowl Ski Area in the Cypress Provincial Park, West Vancouver.

Results

Qualification
The qualification was held at 09:15.

Elimination round
The top two finishers from each heat advance to the next round. In the semifinals the first two ranked competitors of each heat proceed to the Big Final, third and fourth ranked competitors of each heat proceed to the Small Final.

1/8 round
 

Heat 1

Heat 2

Heat 3

Heat 4

Heat 5

Heat 6

Heat 7

Heat 8

Quarterfinals

Heat 1

Heat 2

Heat 3

Heat 4

Semifinals

Heat 1

Heat 2

Finals
Small Final

Big Final

References

Men's freestyle skiing at the 2010 Winter Olympics
Men's events at the 2010 Winter Olympics